Anthony Soren (born 19 January 1988) is an Indian professional footballer who plays as a striker for Mohammedan S.C. in the I-League.

Career

Mohammedan
Soren made his professional debut for Mohammedan in the I-League on 6 October 2013 against Salgaocar at the Duler Stadium; in which he played till 60th minute before being replaced by Jerry Zirsanga; as Mohammedan lost the match 3–0.

East Bengal 

He started playing for the Kolkata giant in 2015.

Career statistics

References

External links 
 Goal Profile

1988 births
Living people
Indian footballers
Footballers from West Bengal
Mohammedan SC (Kolkata) players
I-League players
Association football midfielders